George Grimm (September 11, 1859October 19, 1945) was an American judge, lawyer, and politician.  He was a Wisconsin Circuit Court Judge for 30 years and served one term in the Wisconsin State Assembly

Biography

Grimm was born in Jefferson, Jefferson County, Wisconsin. He went to Jefferson Liberal Institute and to Northwestern College in Watertown, Wisconsin. In 1879, Grimm received his law degree from University of Michigan Law School and was admitted to the Wisconsin bar. He practiced law in Jefferson, Wisconsin and was involved with farming and beekeeping. Grimm served in the Wisconsin State Assembly in 1887 and was a Republican. Grimm served as a Wisconsin Circuit Court judge for Jefferson County from 1907 to 1937. Grimm died from a stroke at his home in Jefferson, Wisconsin.

Notes

External links

1859 births
1945 deaths
People from Jefferson, Wisconsin
University of Michigan Law School alumni
Wisconsin state court judges
American beekeepers
Farmers from Wisconsin
Republican Party members of the Wisconsin State Assembly